Damir Burić (born 7 July 1964), popularly known as Šolta, is a Croatian professional football manager and former player. He is the current manager of Saudi Arabian club Al-Riyadh.

While playing in Croatia, he got the nickname "Šolta" after the island of Šolta, because roots of his family are from that island.

Playing career
Burić started off his career at GOŠK Dubrovnik, before signing with hometown club RNK Split, where he stayed until 1988, when he went to Germany and became the new player of SV Waldhof Mannheim. He stayed there for four years, until 1992, playing over 50 league games for the club. In the summer od 1992, Burić signed with, back then, 2. Bundesliga club SC Freiburg. In the 1992–93 season, he won the 2. Bundesliga with Freiburg and got qualified to the Bundesliga. He stayed at the club until 1999 (making over 100 league appearances in the process), before going to Borussia Mönchengladbach. He played for the club for one season, until the end of the 1999–00 2. Bundesliga season, after which he decided to end his playing career in July 2000 at the age of 36.

Managerial career
Burić worked in Germany as assistant coach of Freiburg II, Freiburg, Bayer Leverkusen and Werder Bremen. 

On 29 May 2015, he was appointed manager of Prva HNL club Hajduk Split. On 2 June 2016, Burić was sacked after underperforming in the league. In January 2017, he was appointed manager of Austrian Bundesliga club Admira Wacker.

On 9 September 2017, he moved to 2. Bundesliga club SpVgg Greuther Fürth. Almost two and a half years after being given the Greuther Fürth job, Burić got sacked on 4 February 2019, because of the poor results.

On 20 July 2019 following the departure of Siniša Oreščanin, he was hired to be Hajduk Split manager for the second time in his career. On 19 December 2019, he was sacked.

On 22 September 2020, he returned to Admira Wacker.

On 18 September 2022, Burić was appointed as manager of Saudi Arabian club Al-Riyadh.

Managerial statistics

Honours

Player
Freiburg
2. Bundesliga: 1992–93

References

External links

1964 births
Living people
Footballers from Split, Croatia
Association football defenders
Yugoslav footballers
Croatian footballers
RNK Split players
SV Waldhof Mannheim players
SC Freiburg players
Borussia Mönchengladbach players
2. Bundesliga players
Bundesliga players
Yugoslav expatriate footballers
Expatriate footballers in West Germany
Expatriate footballers in Germany
Yugoslav expatriate sportspeople in West Germany
Yugoslav expatriate sportspeople in Germany
Croatian expatriate footballers
Croatian expatriate sportspeople in Germany
Croatian football managers
HNK Hajduk Split managers
FC Admira Wacker Mödling managers
SpVgg Greuther Fürth managers
Al-Riyadh SC managers
Austrian Football Bundesliga managers
2. Bundesliga managers
Saudi First Division League managers
Croatian expatriate football managers
Expatriate football managers in Austria
Croatian expatriate sportspeople in Austria
Expatriate football managers in Germany
Croatian expatriate sportspeople in Saudi Arabia
Expatriate football managers in Saudi Arabia